Michael Sánchez Bozhulev (born June 5, 1986) is a volleyball player from Cuba, who plays for the Men's National Team. He was a member of the national squad that claimed the bronze medal at the 2007 Pan American Games in Rio de Janeiro, Brazil. He also won the silver medal with Al Rayyan in the 2014 World club championship. After the 2007 Pan American Games in Rio de Janeiro he had a major injury, but he recuperated and continued his career.

References
 FIVB biography

1986 births
Living people
Cuban men's volleyball players
Volleyball players at the 2007 Pan American Games
Pan American Games bronze medalists for Cuba
Pan American Games medalists in volleyball
Medalists at the 2007 Pan American Games